The 2018 season was FC Sheriff Tiraspol's 22nd season, and their 21st in the Divizia Naţională, the top-flight of Moldovan football.

Season events
On 24 April, manager Roberto Bordin resigned due to family reasons, with Victor Mihailov taking over in an interim capacity. On 7 June, Goran Sablić was announced as Sheriff Tiraspol's new manager.

Squad

Out on loan

Transfers

Winter

In:

Out:

Summer

In:

Out:

Friendlies

Competitions

Divizia Națională

Results summary

Results

League table

Moldovan Cup

2017–18

2018–19

Semifinals took place during the 2019 season.

UEFA Champions League

Qualifying rounds

UEFA Europa League

Qualifying rounds

Squad Statistics

Appearances and goals

|-
|colspan="16"|Players away on loan :

|-
|colspan="16"|Players who left Sheriff Tiraspol during the season:

|}

Goal scorers

Disciplinary Record

Notes

References

External links 
 

FC Sheriff Tiraspol seasons
Sheriff Tiraspol
Sheriff Tiraspol
Moldovan football clubs 2017–18 season
Moldovan football clubs 2018–19 season